Cecilia Dougherty creates videotapes and digital films which focus on the themes of lesbianism and popular culture.  While her early work places lesbians in a cultural territory separate from mainstream society, other projects portray the lesbian experience in terms of commonly held norms; in her own words, "the life of an ordinary lesbian and her working-class family."

Her work, which is created primarily as video art, is actually not chiefly 'about' lesbianism, but is about the nature of individual experience within society, with strong psychological themes. She uses biography, essay, portraiture and autobiography to examine the nature of human experience.

An early influence in Dougherty's life was the poetry of Robert Graves.

Videography

 Lynne (2004), 6.00, portrait of writer Lynne Tillman
 Kevin and Cedar (2002), 8:30, portrait of writers Kevin Killian and Cedar Sigo
 Gone (2001), 36:42, dual projection video installation, experimental documentary
 Eileen (2000), 10:20, portrait of writer Eileen Myles
 Laurie (1998), 11:02, portrait of writer Laurie Weeks
 Leslie (1998), 11:04, portrait of writer Leslie Scalapino
 Untitled (Crash) (1997), video installation, collaboration with sculptor Taylor Davis
 The dream and the waking (1997), 15:10, experimental documentary video
 My Failure to Assimilate (1995), 20:00, experimental documentary video
 I’m Leaving Home Without You (You Make Me Feel (Mighty Real)), (1994), single channel video installation
 Joe-Joe (1993), 52:00, experimental biography, video collaboration with artist Leslie Singer
 In flux (1993), 50:00, video diary, collaboration with Leslie Singer
 The Drama of the Gifted Child (1992), 5:30, video essay
 Meet Me in Saint Louis, Fuck Me in Kansas City (1992), video diary, collaboration with artist Leslie Singer
 Coal Miner’s Granddaughter (1991), 80:00, fictionalized autobiography
 Hello World, Goodbye San Francisco (1991), 35:00, video diary, collaboration with artist Leslie Singer
 The Temptation of Jane (1990), 50:00, video diary, collaboration with artist Leslie Singer
 The Passion of Jane (1990), 11:00, video letter
 Grapefruit (1989), 39:10, experimental documentary
 Kathy (1988), 12:00, video essay
 Claudia (1987), 7:50, video essay
 Coat of Arms I (1987), 16:00, essay, slow scan video capture
 Coat of Arms II (1987), 8:00, essay, edited version of slow scan video
 76 Trombones (1987), 3:30, experimental video
 Fuck You Purdue (1987), 12:00, video plagiarism based on the work of artist Howard Fried
 Birdland (1986), 16:00, narrative
 Sick (1986), 5:30, documentary
 Gay Tape: Butch and Femme (1985), 26:00, documentary

References

External links

 Cecilia Dougherty in the Video Data Bank
Artist Background Information
Melissa Anderson, "Superstar: The Pat Loud Story/Double Fantasy," The Village Voice, article online,  March 7–13, 2001, 
Aaron Krach, "Festivals: Talent Show, 8th New York Underground's Movie Mish Mash," Indie Wire,  online publication, March 21, 2001, 

American video artists
American lesbian artists
Living people
Year of birth missing (living people)
21st-century American LGBT people